911 Battalion was part of the South West African Territorial Force's 91 Brigade.

History 
This unit was formed in 1977 situated sixty kilometres south of Windhoek at Oamites an old disused copper mine. 911 Battalion was made up of various ethnic groups from SWA, such as Hereros, Damaras, Tswanas, Basters and Coloureds. 911 Battalion became known as "Swing Force" due to its ability to operate as a conventional unit or as a Counter-insurgency (COIN) unit. It recruited from South West Africa at large and deployed predominantly as a reserve force. An infantry element, a mechanised contingent, artillery, and a regiment of Eland armoured cars was included. The unit was never mobilised en masse.

911 Battalion was part of 91 Brigade.

Operational area

The battalion's main operational area was Owamboland, via Oshivello, about two hundred kilometres south of the SWA/Angola border. On entering the Oshivello gate, soldiers had passed over the so-called 'red line' which meant in effect that they were officially on the border and in the operational area.

See also
 Namibian War of Independence
 South African Border War

References

Further reading
Helmoed-Romer Heitman (Author), Paul Hannon (Illustrator), Modern African Wars (3): South-West Africa (Men-At-Arms Series, 242),  Osprey Publishing (November 28, 1991) .

Military history of Namibia
Military units and formations of the Cold War
Military units and formations of South Africa
Military units and formations of South Africa in the Border War
Military units and formations established in 1977